The 2022 Mountain West Conference women's basketball tournament was held between March 6-9, 2022 at the Thomas & Mack Center on the campus of University of Nevada, Las Vegas, in Las Vegas, Nevada.

Seeds
Teams were seeded by conference record, with a ties broken by record between the tied teams followed by record against the regular-season champion, if necessary.

Schedule

Bracket

* denotes overtime period

See also
 2022 Mountain West Conference men's basketball tournament

References

Mountain West Conference women's basketball tournament
2021–22 Mountain West Conference women's basketball season
Mountain West Conference Women's Basketball